Platteville is a Statutory Town in Weld County, Colorado, United States. The population was 2,485 at the 2010 census. It is adjacent to Fort Vasquez on U.S. Highway 85.

History
Platteville was founded on May 27, 1871, and was incorporated on January 1, 1887. The town was named for its location on the Platte River.

Geography
Platteville is located at  (40.214468, -104.824070).

The town is situated along the east bank of the South Platte River at the intersection of U.S. Highway 85 and State Highway 66.

The Fort St. Vrain Generating Station, originally a nuclear power plant and now operating as a natural gas powered electricity generating facility operated by Xcel Energy, is approximately one-quarter-mile northwest of Platteville.

Demographics

At the 2010 census there were 2,485 people, 951 households, and 935 families residing in Platteville. The racial makeup of Platteville was 73.84% White, 0.55% Native American, 0.30% Asian, 0.17% Pacific Islander, 22.24% from other races, and 2.91% from two or more races. Hispanic or Latino of any race were 35.19%.

Of the 786 households 45.4% had children under the age of 18 living with them, 61.6% were married couples living together, 10.1% had a female householder with no husband present, and 24.4% were non-families. 18.1% of households were one person and 5.3% were one person aged 65 or older. The average household size was 3.02 and the average family size was 3.50.

The age distribution was: 32.8% under the age of 18, 9.7% from 18 to 24, 32.3% from 25 to 44, 18.7% from 45 to 64, and 6.5% 65 or older. The median age was 30 years. For every 100 females, there were 103.6 males. For every 100 females age 18 and over, there were 99.5 males.

The median household income was in Platteville was $43,472, and the median family income  was $47,574. Males had a median income of $34,048 versus $25,430 for females. The per capita income for Platteville was $15,802. About 6.9% of families and 8.7% of the population were below the poverty line, including 9.6% of those under age 18 and 5.5% of those age 65 or over.

Arts and culture

Annual cultural events
Platteville celebrates the harvest season every August since 1910. The name of the harvest festival has changed many times over the years, and is currently called, simply, Harvest Daze.

See also

 North Central Colorado Urban Area
 Platteville Atmospheric Observatory

References

External links
Platteville Website Portal style website, Government, Business, Library, Recreation and more
City-Data.com Comprehensive Statistical Data and more about Platteville
CDOT map of the Town of Platteville

Towns in Weld County, Colorado
Towns in Colorado
1871 establishments in Colorado Territory